is a Japanese information technology company headquartered in Tokyo, Japan, offering IT services and computer software. Outside of Japan, It is widely known for its acquisition of Sega in 1984, ended in the sale to Sammy in 2004, through which Sega Sammy Holdings was established.

History
In 1969, Sumitomo Computer Service Corporation was established by Sumitomo Corporation. In 2005, Sumitomo Computer Service Corporation and Sumitomo Electronics Corporation were merged into Sumitomo Computer System Corporation.

Separately, in 1968, CSK Corporation was established by Japanese entrepreneur Isao Okawa in 1968. The acronym CSK was derived from "Computer Service". CSK established CSK Research Institute, later renamed as CRI Middleware, in 1983. At its peak, the company, the largest independent software company in Japan until it being acquired, was called the CSK Group. In the 2000s, its real estate investment business failed, resulting in heavy losses to the company after Okawa's death in 2001.

In April 2011, Sumitomo Corporation acquired CSK through a takeover. In October 2011, Sumitomo Computer System Corporation and CSK Corporation went through a statutory merger, in which Sumitomo Computer System absorbed CSK Corporation and was re-branded SCSK Corporation.

Services 
The company offers the services of system integration, cloud computing, information security and produces computer software in Japan, mostly on a B2B basis for enterprises. SCSK Corporation's business type and scope is similar to those of Itochu Techno-Solutions, Uniadex and Mitsui Knowledge Industry, which also specialize in IT services. The company has been listed on the Tokyo Stock Exchange since 1989, then as Sumitomo Computer Service Corporation.

See also
 List of companies of Japan

References

External links

 Official website

Cloud computing providers
Computer security companies
Information technology consulting firms of Japan
Japanese brands
Software companies of Japan
Service companies based in Tokyo
Sumitomo Group
1969 establishments in Japan